The Mooring Cove Formation is a formation of volcanic rock exposed in outcrops in Newfoundland.

References

Geology of Newfoundland and Labrador